Mackenzie Secondary School is a public high school in Mackenzie, British Columbia part of School District 57 Prince George. Established in 1971, MSS is home to approximately 250 students in Grades 7 - 12. It is situated in the Rocky Mountain Trench.

School Mission and Vision 
Mackenzie Secondary School's mission is to foster a learning community which values cooperation and independent thinking, is based upon mutual respect, and leads to personal fulfillment in a dynamic world.

The school's vision statement is "Striving for Achievement, Belonging, Respect, Empathy, and Social Responsibility" (SABRES).

References

External links
Mackenzie Secondary School

High schools in British Columbia
Educational institutions established in 1970
1970 establishments in British Columbia